Ridge House may refer to:

Ridge House, a student cooperative house in Berkeley, California
Ridge House (Fayetteville, Arkansas)

See also
The Ridge (disambiguation)